Faisal Karami (born 26 September 1971) is a Lebanese politician. He served as the minister of youth and sports in the cabinet of Najib Mikati between 2011 and 2014. He was a member of the parliament between 2018 and 2022.

Early life and education
Karami was born into a Sunni family in Tripoli on 26 September 1971. His father is Omar Karami who was one of the former Prime Minister of Lebanon. He is also the nephew of Rashid Karami, who served as prime minister for eight terms. Faisal Karami studied business administration in the United States.

Career
Karami is the head of the Arab Liberation Party. He was appointed minister of youth and sports in June 2011 to the cabinet of Najib Mikati. He was a non-affiliated member and part of the March 8 coalition in the cabinet. Karami's term ended on 15 February 2014, and Abdul Muttaleb Al Hinawi succeeded him in the post.

Controversy
Karami's appointment led to conflict during the cabinet formation process in 2011 due to the fact that Hezbollah had explicitly asked Mikati to assign Faisal Karami as one of the ministers which was initially refused by Mikati. Mikati argued that if Karami became minister, three of the five seats would be taken by natives of Tripoli (himself, finance minister Mohammad Safadi, and Karami), leading to imbalance in political representation. Nevertheless, Karami was appointed as a non-affiliated minister chosen by Hezbollah, and became the seventh Sunni member of the cabinet after Lebanese Parliament Speaker Nabih Berri’s AMAL party agreed to give up one of its governmental shares for him. Karami's appointment was celebrated in his hometown, Tripoli.

Attack
Karami's convoy was attacked in Tripoli on 18 January 2013, injuring four people. Karami escaped the attack unhurt. Perpetrators were armed radical Sunni Islamists. One of the gunmen was wounded and later arrested.

References

1971 births
Arab Liberation Party politicians
Children of national leaders
Government ministers of Lebanon
Lebanese Sunni Muslims
Living people
People from Tripoli, Lebanon
Sports ministers
21st-century Lebanese politicians